Sascha Brastoff (October 23, 1918 - February 4, 1993) was an iconic mid-century designer who had a ceramics studio.

He was active in the Los Angeles area from 1947 to 1963, after which he left his company due to ill health.

The Sascha Brastoff Ceramics Factory, designed by architects A. Quincy Jones and Frederick Earl Emmons, was located at 11520 West Olympic Boulevard in West Los Angeles.

Brastoff was the long-term romantic partner of Hollywood costume designer Howard Shoup.

References

1918 births
1993 deaths
Ceramics manufacturers of the United States
Artists from Cleveland
People from Los Angeles
American gay artists
LGBT people from Ohio
20th-century American LGBT people